The Gateway is an American crime thriller film directed by Michele Civetta and starring Shea Whigham, Olivia Munn and Frank Grillo.  The screenplay, written by Alexander Felix and originally titled Where Angels Die, was included in the 2013 Black List. The film was released in theaters and on VOD on September 3, 2021.

Plot
A troubled but dedicated social worker assisting a working and struggling single mother and her daughter intervenes when the father returns from prison and drags his family back to his habitual world of crime.

Cast
 Shea Whigham as Parker Jode
 Olivia Munn as Dahlia Montrose
Zach Avery as Mike Montrose
 Bruce Dern as Marcus Jode
 Frank Grillo as Duke Harmaday
Alex Wraith as Louis
Taegen Burns as Ashley Montrose
Jackson James as Tommy
Shannon Adawn as Detective King
Nicholas Daly as Detective Bachman
Mike O'Connell as Stu
 Taryn Manning as Corey Belton
 Mark Boone Junior as Gary Wolfbock
 Keith David as Terry Thompson

Production
The film was shot in Norfolk, Virginia in May 2019.

Release
The film was released in selected theaters and on video-on-demand on September 3, 2021 in the United States.

Reception
The review aggregator website Rotten Tomatoes surveyed  and, categorizing the reviews as positive or negative, assessed 19 as positive and 18 as negative for a 51 percent rating.

References

External links
 

2021 films
2021 crime thriller films
American crime thriller films
Films shot in Virginia
2020s English-language films
Films directed by Michele Civetta
2020s American films